Rajkumar Thukral is an Indian politician and a former member of the Bharatiya Janata Party. Thukral is a member of the Uttarakhand Legislative Assembly from the Rudrapur constituency in Udham Singh Nagar district. He tendered his resignation to the top leadership of the Bharatiya Janata Party on 27 January 2022 after District President of Bharatiya Janata Party. Shiv Arora got ticket from Rudrapur Constituency for Assembly Elections 2022. Shiv Arora won 2022 Uttarakhand Legislative Assembly election from 60602 votes.

References 

People from Udham Singh Nagar district
Bharatiya Janata Party politicians from Uttarakhand
Members of the Uttarakhand Legislative Assembly
Living people
21st-century Indian politicians
Year of birth missing (living people)